The Ca II K line in cool stars is among the strongest emission lines which originates in the star's chromosphere.  In 1957, Olin C. Wilson and M. K. Vainu Bappu reported on the remarkable correlation between the measured width of the aforementioned emission line and the absolute visual magnitude of the star.  This is known as the Wilson–Bappu effect.  The correlation is independent of spectral type and is applicable to stellar classification main sequence types G, K, and Red giant type M.  The greater the emission band, the brighter the star, which is correlated with distance empirically.

The main interest of the Wilson–Bappu effect is in its use for determining the distance of stars too remote for direct measurements.  It can be studied using nearby stars, for which independent distance measurements are possible, and it can be expressed in a simple analytical form.  In other words, the Wilson–Bappu effect can be calibrated with stars within 100 parsecs from the Sun.  The width of the emission core of the K line can be measured in distant stars, so, knowing W0 and the analytical form expressing the Wilson–Bappu effect, we can determine the absolute magnitude of a star.  The distance of a star follows immediately from the knowledge of both absolute and apparent magnitude, provided that the interstellar reddening of the star is either negligible or well known.

The first calibration of the Wilson–Bappu effect using distance from Hipparcos parallaxes was made in 1999 by Wallerstein et al.  A later work also used W0 measurements on high-resolution spectra taken with CCD, but a smaller sample.

According to the latest calibration, the relation between absolute visual magnitude (Mv) expressed in magnitudes and W0, transformed in km/s, is the following:

 

The data error, however, is quite large: about 0.5 mag, rendering the effect too imprecise to significantly improve the cosmic distance ladder. Another limitation comes from the fact that the measurement of W0 in distant stars is very challenging, requires long observations at big telescopes. Sometimes the emission feature in the core of the K line is affected by the interstellar extinction. In these cases an accurate measurement of W0 is not possible.

The Wilson–Bappu effect is also valid for the Mg II k line. However, the Mg II k line is at 2796.34 Å in the ultraviolet, and since the radiation at this wavelength does not reach the earth's surface it can only be observed with satellites such as the International Ultraviolet Explorer.

In 1977, Stencel published a spectroscopic survey that showed that the wing emission features seen in the broad wings of the K line among higher luminosity late type stars, share a correlation of line width and Mv similar to the Wilson–Bappu effect.

References

Astronomical spectroscopy